The molecular formula C18H21NO4 (molar mass: 315.36 g/mol) may refer to:

 Codeine-N-oxide
 Homolycorine
 14-Methoxydihydromorphinone
 Oxycodone

Molecular formulas